Jastrzębska Spółka Węglowa SA is a large coal mining company in Poland producing around 12 million tonnes of coal every year. The company has proven recoverable reserves of 503.4 million tonnes of coal.

External links
Official site

Coal companies of Poland
Companies listed on the Warsaw Stock Exchange